Antonio Mršić (born 5 June 1987) is a Croatian professional footballer who currently plays as a midfielder for Turkish club Ümraniyespor.

Club career
Mršić went through the ranks of the NK Zadar academy, but, not breaking into the first team, despite scoring 30 goals in a season for their U-19 team, he played his first senior minutes for the nearby third-tier side NK Velebit from Benkovac. After his father, the well known coach Stanko Mršić, took over managerial duties at second-tier NK Imotski. He left the club, however, after 6 rounds, joining third-tier Primorac Biograd, where his father would join him later in the season. The young midfielder remained there for the following two seasons, before his games attracted the notice of NK Zadar, which he joined in the summer of 2009. He made his Prva HNL debut on 23 August 2008 in a goalless draw with Dinamo Zagreb. and quickly established himself as a first team regular, which he would remain for the following four seasons. Despite a trial at MŠK Žilina in the summer of 2012, and rumors linking him Dinamo Zagreb, he moved to RNK Split in the summer of 2013.

Honours

Club
Bnei Yehuda
Israel State Cup (1): 2016–17

References

External links
 

Antonio Mršić at Sportnet.hr 

1987 births
Living people
Sportspeople from Zadar
Association football midfielders
Croatian footballers
NK Imotski players
HNK Primorac Biograd na Moru players
NK Zadar players
RNK Split players
Bnei Yehuda Tel Aviv F.C. players
Bnei Sakhnin F.C. players
Hapoel Rishon LeZion F.C. players
Balıkesirspor footballers
Ümraniyespor footballers
Croatian Football League players
Israeli Premier League players
Liga Leumit players
TFF First League players
Süper Lig players
Croatian expatriate footballers
Expatriate footballers in Israel
Croatian expatriate sportspeople in Israel
Expatriate footballers in Turkey
Croatian expatriate sportspeople in Turkey